Oritang (오리탕) is a variety of guk, Korean soup or stew made by slowly simmering duck and various vegetables. Ori means "duck" and tang is another name for guk in Korean. While its recipe depends on region and taste, the soup is generally in a form of a clear soup. Some variants can contain chili pepper powder to make the soup spicy like maeuntang (spicy fish soup) or roasted perilla seeds to thicken the dish. Oritang is a local specialty of Gyeonggi Province and South Jeolla Province, especially Gwangju City. In Gwangju, about 20 restaurants specializing in oritang and other duck dishes are centered on Yudong Alley in Buk-gu (Northern District).

See also
 Samgyetang
 List of duck dishes
 List of soups
 Korean cuisine
 List of Korean dishes

References

Korean soups and stews
Duck dishes